Laura Estela Mulhall (born November 30, 1957) is an Argentine former field hockey goalkeeper, who played more than hundred international matches for the Women's National Team.  She was a member of the team that finished in seventh place at the 1988 Summer Olympics in Seoul, South Korea.  At the age of 40 she competed in her last international tournament, the 1998 Women's Hockey World Cup.  Mulhall was succeeded by Mariela Antoniska.

References 

  Pagina12
  santafedeportivo

External links
 

1957 births
Living people
Las Leonas players
Argentine female field hockey players
Female field hockey goalkeepers
Field hockey players at the 1988 Summer Olympics
Olympic field hockey players of Argentina
Argentine people of Irish descent
Place of birth missing (living people)
Pan American Games gold medalists for Argentina
Pan American Games medalists in field hockey
Field hockey players at the 1987 Pan American Games
Field hockey players at the 1991 Pan American Games
Medalists at the 1987 Pan American Games
Medalists at the 1991 Pan American Games
20th-century Argentine women
21st-century Argentine women